Transit Camp or Temporary Shelter (French: Camp volant) is a 1932 French-German drama film directed by Max Reichmann and starring Ivan Koval-Samborsky, Berthe Ostyn and Meg Lemonnier. It was made as a polyglot film with each actor speaking in their own language. It is set amongst the travelling circus community.

Cast
 Ivan Koval-Samborsky as Marco  
 Berthe Ostyn as Lydia  
 Meg Lemonnier as Gloria  
 Roberto Rey as Bobby Barnes 
 Thomy Bourdelle as Cesare  
 Lili Ziedner as Esmeralda  
 Jeannie Luxeuil as Senta  
 Lissy Arna 
 Louis Lavata 
 Jean Houcke 
 Ilona Karolewna 
 Barbara La May 
 Eugène Stuber 
 Pierre Sergeol 
 Josef Breitbart

References

Bibliography 
 Crisp, Colin. Genre, Myth and Convention in the French Cinema, 1929-1939. Indiana University Press, 2002.
 Neale, Stephen. The Classical Hollywood Reader. Routledge, 2012.

External links 
 

1932 films
1932 drama films
French drama films
German drama films
1930s French-language films
Films directed by Max Reichmann
Circus films
French black-and-white films
German black-and-white films
1930s French films
1930s German films